"What'chu Like" is the lead single released from Da Brat's third album, Unrestricted. The song features R&B singer Tyrese, who provided the song's hook.

Background
Released on March 30, 2000, "What'chu Like" eventually reached No. 26 on the Billboard Hot 100 on August 12, 2000, becoming her sixth and final top 40 single. The song also reached No. 85 on the Billboard Year-End Hot 100 singles of 2000, becoming her third song to reach the Year-End charts after "Funkdafied" in 1994 and "Give It 2 You" in 1995. Like all of Da Brat's previous singles, Jermaine Dupri produced "What'chu Like", using a sample of Claudja Barry's "Love for the Sake of Love" which was also used for Montell Jordan's "Get It On Tonite" only months prior.

Charts

Weekly charts

Year-end charts

References

2000 songs
Da Brat songs
Tyrese Gibson songs
Song recordings produced by Jermaine Dupri
Songs written by Jermaine Dupri
Songs written by Da Brat
2000 singles
So So Def Recordings singles